Cosmic Call was the name of two sets of interstellar radio messages that were sent from RT-70 in Yevpatoria, Ukraine in 1999 (Cosmic Call 1) and 2003 (Cosmic Call 2) to various nearby stars. The messages were designed with noise-resistant format and characters.

The project was funded by Team Encounter, a Texas-based startup, which went out of business in 2004.

Both transmissions were at ~150 kW, 5.01 GHz (FSK +/-24 kHz).

Message structure
Each Cosmic Call 1 session had the following structure. The Scientific Part (DDM, BM, AM, and ESM) was sent three times (at 100 bit/s), and the Public Part (PP) was sent once (at 2000 bit/s), according to the following arrangement:

DDM → BM → AM → ESM → DDM → BM → AM → ESM → DDM → BM → AM → ESM → PP,

where DDM is the Dutil-Dumas Message, created by Canadian scientists Yvan Dutil and Stéphane Dumas, BM is the Braastad Message, AM is the Arecibo Message, and ESM is the Encounter 2001 Staff Message.

Each Cosmic Call 2 session in 2003 had the following structure:

DDM2 → DDM2 → DDM2 → AM → AM → AM → BIG → BIG → BIG → BM → ESM → PP,

where DDM2 is modernized DDM (aka Interstellar Rosetta Stone, ISR), BIG is Bilingual Image Glossary.  All but the PP were transmitted at 400 bit/s

The ISR was 263,906 bits; BM, 88,687 bits, AM, 1,679 bits; BIG was 12 binary images 121,301 bits; ESM 24,899 bits.  Total = 500,472 bits for 53 minutes.  PP was 220 megabytes and sent at a rate of 100,000 bit/s for 11 hours total.

Error in Cosmic Call 1
The DDM incorrectly states the neutron mass as 1.67392... instead of the known value 1.67492... This error was corrected in DDM2.

Stars targeted
The messages were sent to the following stars:

See also
 Arecibo message
 Active SETI
 Communication with extraterrestrial intelligence
 Interstellar messages

References

External links

 Self-Decoding Messages
 Discussion of the Call's "Rosetta Stone" and how it was developed
 Report on Cosmic Call
 Evpatoria 2003 discussion with bitmap and image

Search for extraterrestrial intelligence
Interstellar messages
Time capsules
1999 in science
2003 in science
Technology in society
1999 in Ukraine
2003 in Ukraine